Coleophora arefactella is a moth of the family Coleophoridae. It is found in Spain.

References

arefactella
Moths described in 1859
Moths of Europe